The following is an episode list for the NBC television series Just Shoot Me!. The series premiered on March 4, 1997, and ended its run on August 16, 2003; with three episodes from the final season premiering in syndication from November 24 to November 26, 2003. In total, 148 episodes were produced during 7 seasons.

Series overview

Episodes

Season 1 (1997)

Season 2 (1997–98)

Season 3 (1998–99)

Season 4 (1999–2000)

Season 5 (2000–01)

Season 6 (2001–02)

Season 7 (2002–03)

References

References lead to external links.

External links
 
 

Just Shoot Me!